Crystal Park may refer to:
Crystal Park (Lancaster, Pennsylvania), a municipal park
University Park (Worcester, Massachusetts), also called "Crystal Park"